The Spencer's Point Formation is a geologic formation in Bermuda. It preserves fossils.

See also

 List of fossiliferous stratigraphic units in Bermuda

References
 

Geology of Bermuda
Geologic formations of the Caribbean